The 2022–23 Virginia Tech Hokies men's basketball team represented Virginia Polytechnic Institute and State University during the 2022–23 NCAA Division I men's basketball season. The Hokies were led by fourth-year head coach Mike Young and played their home games at Cassell Coliseum in Blacksburg, Virginia, as members of the Atlantic Coast Conference.

Previous season
The Hokies finished the 2020–21 season 23–13, 11–9 in ACC play, to finish in  seventh place. They defeated Clemson, Notre Dame, and North Carolina to advance to the ACC tournament championship. There they defeated Duke to win the tournament championship. As a result, they received the conference’s automatic bid to the NCAA Tournament as the No. 11 seed in the East region where they lost in the first round to Texas.

Offseason

Departures

Incoming transfers

2022 recruiting class

2023 Recruiting class

Roster

Schedule and results
Source:

|-
!colspan=12 style=| Regular season

|-
!colspan=12 style=| ACC tournament

|-
!colspan=12 style=| NIT

Rankings

*AP does not release post-NCAA tournament rankings

References

Virginia Tech Hokies men's basketball seasons
Virginia Tech
Virginia Tech
Virginia Tech
Virginia Tech